Savo may refer to:

Languages
 Savo dialect, forms of the Finnish language spoken in Savonia
 Savo language, an endangered language spoken on Savo

People
 Savo (given name), a masculine given name from southern Europe (includes a list of people with the name)
 Savo, nickname of Steven Milne (born 1980), Scottish professional footballer

Places

Finland
 Northern Savonia (Finnish: Pohjois-Savo), Finland
 Southern Savonia (Finnish: Etelä-Savo), Finland

Solomon Islands
 Savo Island, off Guadalcanal in the Solomon Islands
 Battle of Savo Island (disambiguation), a number of World War II battles
 USS Savo Island, a U.S. Navy escort carrier named in memory of the battle

United States
 Savo Township, South Dakota, a township in Brown County

Other uses
 1494 Savo, an asteroid in the main-belt
 Ki Savo, part of the annual Jewish cycle of Torah reading
 Savo Hall or Finnish National Society Hall, a historic meeting hall in Savo Township, Brown County, South Dakota, United States

See also
 Savonia (disambiguation)
 Savoy (disambiguation)